Enguerrand IV, Lord of Coucy (c. 1236 – 1311) was the son of Enguerrand III, Lord of Coucy and Marie de Montmirail. He succeeded his older brother Raoul II, Lord of Coucy, serving as the Sire de Coucy from his brother's death in 1250 until his own in 1311.

Biography
Enguerrand IV succeeded to the large fief established by his father, Enguerrand the Great, due to his elder brother's death on crusade.  Enguerrand IV's rule was notable for his crimes and cruelty. Setting an important medieval legal precedent, King Louis IX of France refused to allow him trial by combat for the hanging of three Flemish squires found on his land, and imprisoned him instead. In the end, Enguerrand escaped with a fine, and through his wealth remained important to the King, lending him 15,000 livres in 1265 to purchase a piece of the True Cross. He was married twice: his first wife was Margaret of Guelders, and his second wife was Jeanne of Flanders, daughter of Robert III, Count of Flanders. He had no children by either marriage and was succeeded in 1311 by the second son of his sister, Alix, who became Enguerrand V.

References

Sources

1236 births
1311 deaths
Lords of Coucy
Trials by combat